The 2022 Pakistan landslides began on 20 January and lasted until 23 January as heavy rains caused multiple landslides and buildings to collapse. In total, eight people were killed by the storm system.

See also
Weather of 2022

References

Landslides
2022 in Khyber Pakhtunkhwa
2022 meteorology
Disasters in Khyber Pakhtunkhwa
Landslides
Landslides in 2022
2022